Yoshinao Kamata (釜田 佳直, born October 26, 1993 in Komatsu, Ishikawa) is a Japanese professional baseball pitcher for the Tohoku Rakuten Golden Eagles in Japan's Nippon Professional Baseball.

External links

NPB stats

1993 births
Living people
Baseball people from Ishikawa Prefecture
Japanese baseball players
Nippon Professional Baseball pitchers
Tohoku Rakuten Golden Eagles players